Ulrich Müller (born 6 July 1940 in Bogotá) is a German chemist that is known for his works on solid-state chemistry and the application of crystallographic group theory to crystal chemistry. He is the author of several textbooks on chemistry, solid-state chemistry, and crystallography.

Life 
Müller studied chemistry at the University of Stuttgart from 1959 to 1963. He worked on his dissertation at the Purdue University and the University of Stuttgart. He finished it in 1966 in the group of Kurt Dehnicke. From 1967 to 1970, he worked in the group of Hartmut Bärnighausen at the University of Marburg. In 1972, he finished his habilitation. From 1972 to 1975, Müller was a professor for inorganic chemistry at the University of Marburg. From 1975 to 1977, he was a guest professor at the University of Costa Rica. Then, several professorships for inorganic chemistry followed: University of Marburg from 1977 to 1992, University of Kassel from 1992 to 1999, and University of Marburg from 2000 to 2005. Since 2005, he has been an emeritus professor.

Research 
His research focused on the following topics:

 application of crystallographic group theory in crystal chemistry to investigate structural relationships of crystalline solids and to predict possible structure types for inorganic compounds
 synthesis of thio, polysulfido, and polyselenido complexes
 structural analysis of crystalline solids with X-ray diffraction

Awards 
He was awarded the Literaturpreis des Fonds der chemischen Industrie for his textbook "Anorganische Strukturchemie" (engl. Inorganic Structural Chemistry).

Publications

References 

Living people
20th-century German chemists
Crystallographers
1940 births
Academic staff of the University of Marburg
University of Stuttgart alumni
Solid state chemists